Hanania Baer (born 24 September 1943) is a cinematographer who was born in Israel and works in the United States. He won a Daytime Emmy in 1984 for the ABC Afterschool Specials episode Andrea's Story: A Hitchhiking Tragedy.

Filmography
Breakin'
Breakin' 2: Electric Boogaloo
Masters of the Universe
A Christmas Carol
Elvira, Mistress of the Dark
Ninja III: The Domination
Déjà Vu

References

1943 births
Daytime Emmy Award winners
Israeli cinematographers
Living people
Israeli expatriates in the United States